Mario Inchausti Goitia (3 June 1915 – 2 May 2006) was a Cuban footballer.

Club career
Born in Caibarién, Cuba, he emigrated to Spain aged 10 and played for Real Zaragoza, Real Betis and Real Madrid, before retiring in 1942 due to injury.

References

External links
 Player profile at LFP (archived 10 September 2007)
 Player profile at Weltfußball.de

1915 births
2006 deaths
People from Caibarién
Cuban people of Spanish descent
Cuban people of Basque descent
Spanish people of Cuban descent
Association football goalkeepers
Cuban footballers
Real Zaragoza players
Real Betis players
Real Madrid CF players
Cuban expatriate footballers
Cuban expatriate sportspeople in Spain
Expatriate footballers in Spain
La Liga players